Douglas Bronston  (1887 – 1951) was an American screenwriter and writer.

Biography
Born in 1887 in Richmond, Kentucky, Bronston worked at newspapers before joining the Balboa Amusement Producing Company's scenario department as one of several newspaper men recruited into the film industry. He wrote the stories for various films and film serials as well as screenplays based on stories written by others.

He died in 1951 in Santa Monica, California.

Filmography
Neal of the Navy (1915)
The Grip of Evil (1916), a serial
Scratched (1916)
The Inspirations of Harry Larrabee (1917) based on the short story "The Inspirations of Harry Larrabee" by Howard Fielding (a pseudonym of Charles Witherle Hooke)
Thieves (1919)
An Amateur Devil (1920)
She Couldn't Help It (1920), with Channing Pollock
The Outside Woman (1921)
The House That Jazz Built (1921)
The Oregon Trail (1923), a serial, one of the writers
An Enemy of Men (1925)
 Shameful Behavior? (1926)
 Redheads Preferred (1926)
When the Wife's Away (1926)
The Thrill Hunter (1926)
Snowbound (1927)
Husband Hunters (1927)

References

External links

1887 births
1951 deaths
Screenwriters from California
People from Richmond, Kentucky
20th-century American newspaper editors
Burials at Los Angeles National Cemetery
20th-century American screenwriters